John Devon Roland "Jon" Pertwee (7 July 1919 – 20 May 1996) was an English actor, comedian, entertainer, cabaret performer and TV presenter. Born into a theatrical family, he served in the Royal Navy and the Naval Intelligence Division during the Second World War. In his early career he worked as a stage comedian, which included performing at the Glasgow Empire Theatre and sharing a bill with Max Wall and Jimmy James.

As an actor, Pertwee appeared in many comedy roles, including four films in the Carry On series, and he became widely known for spending 18 years (1959–1977) playing Chief Petty Officer Pertwee (and three other roles) in the sitcom The Navy Lark on BBC Radio. On television, Pertwee starred as the third incarnation of the Doctor in the long-running British science fiction series Doctor Who (1970–1974), hosted the game show Whodunnit? (1974–1978), and played the title character in Worzel Gummidge (1979–1981 and 1987–1989). Towards the end of his life he maintained a close association with Doctor Who by appearing at many fan conventions related to the series and giving interviews. He also performed a one-man show called Who Is Jon Pertwee?

Biography

Early life and education
Born in Chelsea, London, and, having French Huguenot ancestry, his surname was an Anglicisation of "Perthuis", the origins of his surname being "de Perthuis de Laillevault", the family being Counts descended from Charlemagne. Jon was the son of screenwriter and actor Roland Pertwee and distant cousin of actor Bill Pertwee. Pertwee's mother, Avice Scholtz, separated from his father Roland when Pertwee was young. His father remarried, and his mother found a new partner, Louis Auguste De La Garde, with whom Pertwee did not build a relationship; she died in 1951, leaving Pertwee's elder brother Michael as her executor. Avice's sister Daphne married Captain Philip Cecil Clowes and became the mother of Pertwee's cousin, the writer St John Legh Clowes (1907–1951). Actor Henry Ainley, a close friend of his father, was his godfather. Coincidentally, Ainley's son Anthony appeared as the Master – a renegade Time Lord who was The Doctor's greatest enemy – alongside Pertwee in the Doctor Who anniversary story The Five Doctors (1983).

Pertwee was educated at Frensham Heights School, an independent school in Rowledge, near Farnham in Surrey, at Sherborne School in Dorset, and at some other schools from which he was expelled. After school, he applied to the Central School of Speech & Drama, but was denied admittance because of his lisp. He was admitted to the Royal Academy of Dramatic Art (RADA), graduating in 1939. He was accused of writing graffiti about the tutors on the lavatory walls.

Early career
While still at school, Pertwee worked as a circus performer riding the Wall of Death on a motorcycle with a toothless lion in the sidecar. He then worked in repertory theatre before being contracted with the BBC at 18 as an actor.

During the Second World War, Pertwee spent six years in the Royal Navy. Later, he was attached to the highly-secretive Naval Intelligence Division, working alongside future James Bond author Ian Fleming, and reporting directly to Prime Minister Winston Churchill and Deputy Prime Minister Clement Attlee. In an interview conducted in 1994 and published in 2013, he said, "I did all sorts. Teaching commandos how to use escapology equipment, compasses in brass buttons, secret maps in white cotton handkerchiefs, pipes you could smoke that also fired a .22 bullet. All sorts of incredible things." During his time in the Navy, Pertwee woke up one morning after a drunken night out while in port to find a tattoo of a cobra on his right arm.

After the war he began to work as a comedy actor on radio, becoming known for being able to do a variety of comedic voices and accents. He did voice work in Waterlogged Spa, alongside Eric Barker, and Puffney Post Office in which he played a hapless old postman with the catch-phrase "It doesn't matter what you do, as long as you tears them up." On 15 November 1948, at the Wood Green Empire, he was billed as "The Most Versatile Voice in Radio – Jon ('Tear 'em Up') Pertwee from the Radio Shows Merry-go-Round and Up the Pole". From 1959 to 1977, he performed the  role of the conniving Chief Petty Officer Pertwee in The Navy Lark on BBC Radio. The fictional ship in the series HMS Troutbridge almost shared its name with the real HMS Troubridge whose commanding officer was a relative of Pertwee's who wrote to the BBC to provide details of comic incidents on the ship which were then used in  The Navy Lark's scripts. After Ronnie Barker left the series Pertwee took on various additional roles in the series. These included a villainous character called the Master, whose voice Pertwee said was an impression of Herbert Beerbohm Tree. Pertwee did not appear in the 1959 film version of The Navy Lark. In his 1996 memoir he attributed this to producer Herbert Wilcox refusing to employ his co-star Dennis Price on the grounds that "he was gay", a decision Pertwee made clear that he thought "was ridiculous". Shortly after voicing his support of Price he found out he had been dropped  from the film's cast and replaced by Ronald Shiner.

He was known as a Danny Kaye look-alike, and his impersonation of Kaye can be seen in the film Murder at the Windmill (1949). He played Charlie Sterling in Will Any Gentleman...? (1953). Future Doctor Who actor William Hartnell was also in the film; he played Inspector Martin.

On stage, he played the part of Lycus in the 1963 London production of A Funny Thing Happened on the Way to the Forum with Frankie Howerd and appeared in the smaller role of Crassus in the 1966 film version. He appeared as Sidney Tait in the comedy film Ladies Who Do (1963). In 1966, Pertwee starred alongside Donald Sinden in the original West End production of the long-running comedy There's a Girl in My Soup and in this period appeared in several Carry On films: Carry On Cleo (1964), as the soothsayer; Carry On Cowboy (1965) as Sheriff Earp; and Carry On Screaming! (1966) as Dr. Fettle. (Carry On Columbus, with Pertwee in his fourth Carry On  role, this time as the Duke of Costa Brava, was released in 1992). In 1967, he was chosen by Dad's Army producer David Croft for the role of Captain George Mainwaring, but Pertwee turned it down – possibly because he preferred to extend his role on Broadway in There's a Girl in My Soup. In a lost interview from 1986, which was later rediscovered and published in 2008, he did not want his work on the Carry On films to overshadow his reputation as a serious actor.

His television career had started off with small parts in children's shows featuring Richard Hearne's Mr Pastry character. Later he made an appearance in The Avengers episode "From Venus With Love" (1967) as Brigadier Whitehead, and later, he guest-starred as a vicar in The Goodies' episode "Wacky Wales" (1975).

Doctor Who

In 1969, shortly before leaving the series, producer Peter Bryant cast Pertwee as the Third Doctor in Doctor Who. Pertwee had asked his agent to apply for the role for him and was surprised to find he was already on the shortlist. He was the second choice for the role; Ron Moody was the first but was unavailable.

In a departure from the Doctor's first two incarnations, Pertwee's era was influenced by the James Bond film series. He played the character as an active crusader with a penchant for action and fancy clothes, while the character was exiled to Earth by the Time Lords for much of his tenure and serving as the scientific adviser to Brigadier Lethbridge-Stewart and UNIT. He played the Doctor for five seasons from early 1970 to mid-1974, a longer stint than either of his predecessors in the role, although he ultimately appeared in fewer episodes than William Hartnell as the BBC had reduced the production schedule.

Pertwee credited his performance as the Doctor with helping him work out exactly who he really was when he was not resorting to comedic disguises or voices: a dapper, technologically oriented man of action. This was because the BBC's Head of Drama, Shaun Sutton, had advised him to act the Doctor as himself: in effect, to "play Jon Pertwee". Pertwee's interpretation of the Doctor was described as "a man of action, supremely confident, articulate, yet also warmly reassuring". This incarnation was credited with being more action-oriented and scientifically minded than early versions of the Doctor. In The Making of Doctor Who, Pertwee himself said "Doctor Who is me – or I am Doctor Who. I play him straight from me."

On 14 April 1971, Pertwee was the subject of Thames Television's This Is Your Life.

During his tenure as the Doctor, Pertwee appeared in the Amicus horror anthology The House That Dripped Blood (1971), which was filmed in the summer of 1970 between his first and second Doctor Who seasons. Pertwee played the lead in the last segment of the film as Paul Henderson, an arrogant horror film star who meets his doom thanks to a genuine vampire cloak. In 1973, Pertwee endorsed the Co-op's Baking Your Cake and Eating It, a recipe book written by Sarah Charles. It has been given the unofficial title of The Jon Pertwee Recipe Book.

In early 1974, Pertwee announced he would step down as the Doctor to resume his stage career in The Bedwinner, also citing potential typecasting in the role as the reason for leaving, though he later said that the catalyst for his departure was the death of his good friend and co-star Roger Delgado (The Master) and the departures of co-star Katy Manning and producer Barry Letts. Also, according to Elisabeth Sladen in an interview on the DVD release of Invasion of the Dinosaurs, Pertwee asked for a substantially increased fee for another year on the series, which was turned down, and he subsequently resigned from the role. Pertwee was also dealing with chronic back pain at the time, and was becoming less interested in the character of the Doctor. His last full-time appearance in the series was in the story Planet of the Spiders in June 1974, which finished with Tom Baker replacing him in the role.

Pertwee later reprised the role in the 20th anniversary story The Five Doctors and the Children in Need story Dimensions in Time, in two radio adventures and on stage in Doctor Who – The Ultimate Adventure.

Worzel Gummidge

After a stint between 1974 and 1978 as the host of the Thames Television murder-mystery game show Whodunnit?, Pertwee took the starring role in Worzel Gummidge, based on the books written by Barbara Euphan Todd. Produced by ITV franchise contractor Southern Television in the initial run, it was first transmitted on ITV from 1979. Pertwee had first been approached to play the part of  Worzel Gummidge in a film to be written by Keith Waterhouse and Willis Hall. When this project fell through, Pertwee encouraged the writers to create a television pilot instead, and via his agent pitched the idea to the BBC, which turned it down, and then Thames Television, which likewise rejected the project. Pertwee later admitted that he "began to lose faith in the project", until Southern Television's Lewis Rudd heard about it and enthusiastically agreed that the company would make the series.

The series saw Pertwee as a scarecrow, as well as using several comedic voices. The show was an immediate hit, with Pertwee describing it as "becoming something of a cult" after only four episodes had been broadcast. Press interest in the series was high, and it ran on the channel until 1981. Keen to continue beyond this, Pertwee campaigned for the series and it was picked up by a New Zealand network, TVNZ, in 1987. Worzel Gummidge Down Under aired for the next two years and was screened in the UK on Channel 4. In 1995, Pertwee played the role one last time in a one-off special for ITV, which celebrated 40 years of the channel. Pertwee played the title character in Worzel Gummidge, the Musical, book and lyrics by Keith Waterhouse and Willis Hall, music by Denis King, which opened at London's Cambridge Theatre in December 1981, co-starring Una Stubbs and Geoffrey Bayldon. Pertwee also recorded an album, Worzel Gummidge Sings, as well as a Christmas single.

Other roles
Pertwee played the role of The Colonel in the Disney children's film One of Our Dinosaurs Is Missing (1975). The following year, he voiced and appeared in the television advertisement that promoted the Green Cross Code by use of the mnemonic "SPLINK". Also in 1976, Pertwee starred with Australian singer Julie Anthony in a West End production of the musical Irene (originally 1919, revived Broadway 1973), playing the camp fashion-designer Madame Lucy (originally Liam O'Dougherty). The production opened at the Adelphi Theatre, London, and enjoyed a run of more than 900 performances: Pertwee features on the cast recording album, produced by Norman Newell for EMI Records (EMC3139). He also voiced the character of "Spotty" in the cartoon series SuperTed (1983–86) and, in 1985, starred in Do You Know The Milkyway?, a television adaptation of Karl Wittlinger's stage play in which Pertwee played Dr. Neuross and another nine characters. In 1995, he also had the key voice of Death and other voice characterisations in the PC and PlayStation renditions of Discworld. Also in 1995, he played General Von Kramer in the Young Indiana Jones Chronicles episode "Attack of the Hawkmen".

Writing shortly before his death in 1996, Pertwee stated that while he enjoyed his association with  Doctor Who, he had perhaps spent too long in the title role. He believed that this led to the "ridiculous situation of people turning me down for parts because, they say, I am too well known as the Doctor." He observed that after he left the show he only ever worked in a BBC drama on one occasion. This was in the role of "an aging Basque arsonist and pornographer" in an episode of Virtual Murder titled "A Torch for Silverado". He considered this to be one of "the best things I've ever done"

Later life
He returned to the role of the Doctor in 1983 for the 20th-anniversary television special The Five Doctors and in the 1993 charity special Dimensions in Time for Children in Need. He also portrayed the Doctor in the stage play Doctor Who – The Ultimate Adventure which toured theatres in the United Kingdom from March to June 1989. During the 1990s, he made a guest appearance in the "Lords and Ladies" episode of the BBC Radio 4 comedy series Harry Hill's Fruit Corner, playing a Time Lord and also spoofed the role in the Radio 4 comedy The Skivers. He also presented the Doctor Who video releases The Troughton Years (1991), showcasing selected surviving episodes of otherwise lost stories, and The Pertwee Years (1992), the latter a look back at his time on the show, with three selected episodes.

In 1993, Pertwee was featured in the unofficial 30th anniversary VHS release entitled 30 Years of Time Travel and Beyond. When asked in an interview for this documentary if the show should be brought back he simply replied with "No, no", but believed if it did come back a lot more money would need to be spent on the series, along with a new production team. Pertwee would continue to act in films and television as well as make appearances worldwide in support of Doctor Who. Ultimately, Pertwee was successful in seeing the Third Doctor return to the airwaves with two audio productions for BBC Radio, The Paradise of Death and The Ghosts of N-Space.

In April 1995, he appeared in Devious, an amateur video drama set between the second Doctor's trial at the end of The War Games and before the start of Spearhead from Space. It shows an interim Doctor (between second and third), played by Tony Garner, being told he was "never meant to be the Doctor" and that the third will complete him. Pertwee's scenes in that role were among the first pieces of the video that were released (on the DVD of The War Games). In the same year, he starred in a one-man show called Who Is Jon Pertwee?.

Pertwee's final film role was in a short film entitled Cloud Cuckoo for Scottish Screen, released on 18 June 1994. His last formal television appearance was on Cilla Black's Surprise, Surprise, broadcast on 21 April 1996, in which he appeared as the Third Doctor. At the date of his death Pertwee was regularly being seen in the closing moments of a UK TV commercial for mobile phone operator Vodafone, dressed in the style of his version of the Doctor. This character walked wordlessly across an alleyway in sight of a Liverpool landmark, and entered a garage evidently containing some kind of time machine.

Personal life
Pertwee married twice. His first marriage was in 1955, to Jean Marsh, whom he divorced in 1960; later that same year he married Ingeborg Rhoesa (born 1935). Together they had two children, both of whom became actors: a daughter, Dariel, in 1961, and a son, Sean, in 1964.

Pertwee wrote two autobiographies: Moon Boots and Dinner Suits (published in 1984), which primarily covers his life and career prior to Doctor Who, and the posthumously published Doctor Who: I Am the Doctor – Jon Pertwee’s Final Memoir, (published in November 1996 by Virgin Publishing Ltd. under the Doctor Who Books imprint and co-written with David J. Howe), which covered his life during and after the series. In 2000, Jon Pertwee: The Biography by Bernard Bale was published by André Deutsch, and it included a few chapters by Pertwee's widow Ingeborg.

Death and legacy
Pertwee continued on the Doctor Who convention circuit, and with his voice and television acting, until his death; he died in his sleep from a heart attack in Connecticut on 20 May 1996, at the age of 76. He was survived by Ingeborg and their two children. His immediate successor in the starring role of Doctor Who, Tom Baker, paid tribute, saying: "I am very sorry to hear the news. I was a great admirer of such a stylish actor." Another of his successors in the role, Colin Baker, said: "He was a man of such presence and stature. I can't believe he has gone – it is a great shock. Of all of the interpretations of the Doctors his was the most straight in terms of avoiding comedy." His body was cremated at Putney Vale Crematorium with a toy Worzel Gummidge affixed to the coffin, following the instructions in his will.

His death came six days after the American broadcast of the Doctor Who television film, which used in its opening credits a logo based on that from his era of the television series. The BBC broadcast of the film, on 27 May 1996, featured a dedication to Pertwee at its end.

Legacy
His last association with Doctor Who was posthumous. With the approval of his widow, Ingeborg, his voice was used as part of the plot of the Big Finish Productions' 40th Anniversary audio drama, Zagreus, appearing as messages from the Doctor's TARDIS as it attempted to help the currently corrupted Eighth Doctor (voiced by Paul McGann). Pertwee's voice was culled from the fan-produced Doctor Who film Devious.

Archival footage of Pertwee has been used several times in the revived Doctor Who. Footage appears in "The Next Doctor" when the Tenth Doctor shows Jackson Lake an infostamp about himself, and in "The Eleventh Hour" when the Eleventh Doctor rhetorically asks the Atraxi how previous alien invasion attempts were stopped. Footage of Pertwee was used in "The Name of the Doctor" to depict his Doctor interacting with a version of Clara Oswald, in "The Lodger" in a montage of bits from the Doctor's past, and in "The Day of the Doctor" to depict the Third Doctor assisting his other incarnations in sending Gallifrey to a pocket universe to protect it from the Daleks.

A star was nicknamed after him in 1986. In 2016, his work was honoured with a blue plaque at the New Wimbledon Theatre, which was arranged by the Doctor Who Appreciation Society.

Discography

In 1962, Pertwee released an album entitled Jon Pertwee Sings Songs For Vulgar Boatmen.
In 1966, Pertwee contributed to the children's album Children's Favourites (Music for Pleasure, MDP 1175). Songs sung by him include "The Runaway Train", "Froggy Went A-Courtin'", "My Grandfather's Clock", "Three Little Fishes" and "I Know An Old Lady". The recordings were produced by Norman Newell, with a synopsis written on the back by Roger St. Pierre. On the front cover is the picture of a glove puppet by Carol Patmore & Rima Reed. At least one of the songs, "The Runaway Train" (b/w "The Ugly Duckling"), was released as a single on Music for Pleasure (catalogue FP 10).
In 1972, he recorded with June Whitfield, Wonderful Children's Songs on the Contour label (catalogue 2870191)
In 1972, Pertwee performed a vocal narration over the Doctor Who theme music entitled "Who is the Doctor", on Purple Records.
In 1976, he starred in the EMI original cast recording (EMC 3139) of the West End musical Irene, in which he had enjoyed a long run, playing 'Madame Lucy' at the Adelphi Theatre, London.
In 1976, he recorded a promotional flexi-disc for Heinz called "The Noodle Doodle Man", a song that accompanied a television commercial to which Pertwee contributed the vocal performance.
In 1980, he released "Worzel's Song", from the album Worzel Gummidge Sings. The single reached No.33 on the UK charts in March. A second single was released in 1987 when the series was revived, but this met with less success. Also released in 1984 was a single entitled Jon Pertwee and Friends Sing the Beatles which comprised "Yesterday", featuring a semi-spoken-word performance, and "When I'm 64", in the guise of Worzel Gummidge. This record was intended to aid the Liverpool Children's Hospital.
In 1993, an audio release of the radio play The Paradise of Death reached No.48 in the album charts.
In 1984, he featured in the computer game audio tape of Deus Ex Machina by Automata UK, released for the ZX Spectrum in 1984, and later on the MSX and Commodore 64.

Filmography

Film

Television

Video games

Bibliography

As author

As contributor

References

External links

 
 Jon Pertwee Biography – British Film Institute
 
 Action Who – Jon Pertwee article at Kasterborous.com 
 Jon Pertwee's career including The Navy Lark at http://www.kastria.net

1919 births
1996 deaths
20th-century English comedians
20th-century English male actors
Admiralty personnel of World War II
Alumni of RADA
Audiobook narrators
British male comedy actors
Burials at Putney Vale Cemetery
Children's Hour presenters
English game show hosts
English male comedians
English male film actors
English male radio actors
English male television actors
English male video game actors
English male voice actors
Military personnel from London
English people of French descent
Male actors from London
People educated at Frensham Heights School
People educated at Sherborne School
People from Chelsea, London
Jon
Royal Navy officers of World War II